Titanic is a 1997 American epic romance and disaster film directed, written, produced, and co-edited by James Cameron. Incorporating both historical and fictionalized aspects, it is based on accounts of the sinking of the RMS Titanic and stars Kate Winslet and Leonardo DiCaprio as members of different social classes who fall in love aboard the ship during its ill-fated maiden voyage. The film also features Billy Zane, Kathy Bates, Frances Fisher, Gloria Stuart, Bernard Hill, Jonathan Hyde, Victor Garber, and Bill Paxton.

Cameron's inspiration for the film came from his fascination with shipwrecks; he felt a love story interspersed with the human loss would be essential to convey the emotional impact of the disaster. Production began on September 1, 1995, when Cameron shot footage of the actual Titanic wreck. The modern scenes on the research vessel were shot on board the Akademik Mstislav Keldysh, which Cameron had used as a base when filming the wreck. Scale models, computer-generated imagery, and a reconstruction of the Titanic built at Baja Studios were used to re-create the sinking. The film was co-financed by Paramount Pictures and 20th Century Fox; the former handled distribution in North America while the latter released the film internationally. It was the most expensive film ever made at the time, with a production budget of $200 million. Filming took place from July 1996 to March 1997.

Upon its release on December 19, 1997, Titanic achieved significant critical and commercial success, and then received numerous accolades. It was praised for its visual effects, performances (particularly DiCaprio, Winslet, and Stuart), production values, Cameron's direction, musical score, cinematography, story, and emotional depth. Nominated for 14 Academy Awards, it tied All About Eve (1950) for the most Oscar nominations, and won 11, including the awards for Best Picture and Best Director, tying Ben-Hur (1959) for the most Oscars won by a single film.  With an initial worldwide gross of over $1.84 billion, Titanic was the first film to reach the billion-dollar mark. It remained the highest-grossing film of all time until Cameron's next film, Avatar, surpassed it in 2010. A number of re-releases since 1997 have pushed the film's worldwide total to $2.249 billion, making it the second film to gross more than $2 billion worldwide (after Avatar). It was also selected for preservation in the United States National Film Registry in 2017 for being "culturally, historically or aesthetically significant".

Plot

In 1996, aboard the research vessel Akademik Mstislav Keldysh, Brock Lovett and his team search the wreck of RMS Titanic. They recover a safe they hope contains a necklace with a large diamond known as the Heart of the Ocean. Instead, they only find a drawing of a young nude woman wearing the necklace. The sketch is dated April 14, 1912, the same day the Titanic struck the iceberg that caused it to sink. Rose Dawson Calvert, the woman in the drawing, is brought aboard Keldysh, and recounts her experiences.

In 1912 Southampton, 17-year-old Rose DeWitt Bukater, her wealthy fiancé Caledon "Cal" Hockley, and Rose's widowed mother Ruth, board the Titanic. Ruth emphasizes that Rose's marrying Cal will resolve the family's financial problems and maintain their upper-class status. Meanwhile, Jack Dawson, a poor young artist, wins a third-class Titanic ticket in a poker game. After setting sail, Rose, distraught over her loveless engagement, climbs over the stern railing to jump overboard. Jack appears and coaxes her back onto the deck, and they develop a tentative friendship. When Cal and Ruth strongly object, Rose discourages Jack's attention, but realizing she has fallen in love with him, she returns to him, who reciprocates.

Rose brings Jack to her state room and requests he draw her nude, wearing only the Heart of the Ocean. They later evade Cal's servant, Lovejoy, and have sex in a Renault Towncar inside the cargo hold. On the forward deck, they witness the ship's collision with an iceberg, overhearing its officers and builder discussing it. Cal discovers Jack's sketch and Rose's insulting note left inside his safe, along with the necklace. When Jack and Rose return to warn the others about the collision, Cal has Lovejoy slip the necklace into Jack's pocket to frame him for theft. Jack is then confined in the master-at-arms' office. Cal then puts the necklace into his own overcoat pocket.

With the ship sinking, Rose flees Cal and Ruth, who has boarded a lifeboat. Rose finds and frees Jack, and they barely make it back to the boat deck. Cal and Jack urge Rose to board a lifeboat. Intending to save himself, Cal lies that he will get Jack safely off the ship. As her lifeboat is lowered, Rose, unable to abandon Jack, jumps back to the ship. Cal grabs Lovejoy's pistol and chases Jack and Rose; they get away, and Cal realizes that he gave his coat, and consequently the necklace, to Rose. He later boards a lifeboat posing as a lost child's father, knowing the crew prioritized women and children for evacuation.

Jack and Rose return to the boat deck. The lifeboats have departed and the ship's stern is rising as the flooded bow sinks; the two desperately cling to the stern rail. The upended ship breaks in half and the bow section dives downward. The remaining stern slams back onto the ocean, then upends again before it, too, sinks. In the freezing water, Jack helps Rose onto a wood transom panel among the debris, buoyant enough for only one person, and makes her promise to survive. Jack dies of hypothermia, and Rose is saved by a returning lifeboat.

The RMS Carpathia rescues the survivors; Rose avoids Cal by hiding among the steerage passengers and gives her name as Rose Dawson. Still wearing Cal's overcoat, she discovers the necklace tucked inside the pocket. In the present, Rose says she later heard that Cal committed suicide after losing his fortune in the Wall Street Crash of 1929. Lovett abandons his search after hearing Rose's story. Alone on the stern of Keldysh, Rose takes the Heart of the Ocean, which has been in her possession all along, and drops it into the sea over the wreck site. While she is seemingly asleep in her bed, her photos on the dresser depict a life of freedom and adventure inspired by her early conversations with Jack. A young Rose reunites with Jack at the Titanic Grand Staircase, applauded by those who died on the ship.

Cast

Fictional characters

 Kate Winslet as Rose DeWitt Bukater: Cameron said Winslet "had the thing that you look for" and that there was "a quality in her face, in her eyes," that he "just knew people would be ready to go the distance with her". Rose is a 17-year-old girl, originally from Philadelphia, who is forced into an engagement to 30-year-old Cal Hockley so she and her mother, Ruth, can maintain their high-class status after her father's death had left the family debt-ridden. Rose boards the RMS Titanic with Cal and Ruth, as a first-class passenger, and meets Jack. Winslet said of her character, "She has got a lot to give, and she's got a very open heart. And she wants to explore and adventure the world, but she [feels] that's not going to happen." Gwyneth Paltrow, Winona Ryder, Claire Danes, Gabrielle Anwar, and Reese Witherspoon had been considered for the role. When they turned it down, Winslet campaigned heavily for the role. She sent Cameron daily notes from England, which led Cameron to invite her to Hollywood for auditions. As with DiCaprio, casting director Mali Finn originally brought her to Cameron's attention. When looking for a Rose, Cameron described the character as "an Audrey Hepburn type" and was initially uncertain about casting Winslet even after her screen test impressed him. After she screen tested with DiCaprio, Winslet was so thoroughly impressed with him, that she whispered to Cameron, "He's great. Even if you don't pick me, pick him." Winslet sent Cameron a single rose with a card signed, "From Your Rose", and lobbied him by phone. "You don't understand!" she pleaded one day when she reached him by mobile phone in his Humvee. "I am Rose! I don't know why you're even seeing anyone else!" Her persistence, as well as her talent, eventually convinced him to cast her in the role.
 Leonardo DiCaprio as Jack Dawson: Cameron said he needed the cast to feel they were really on the Titanic, to relive its liveliness, and "to take that energy and give it to Jack, ... an artist who is able to have his heart soar". Jack is portrayed as an itinerant, poor orphan from Chippewa Falls, Wisconsin, who has travelled the world, including Paris. He wins two third-class tickets for the Titanic in a poker game and travels with his friend Fabrizio. He is attracted to Rose at first sight. Her fiancé's invitation to dine with them the next evening enables Jack to mix with the first-class passengers for a night. Cameron's original choice for the role was River Phoenix, however he died in 1993. Though established actors like Matthew McConaughey, Chris O'Donnell, Billy Crudup, and Stephen Dorff were considered, Cameron felt they were too old for the part of a 20-year-old. Tom Cruise was interested, but his asking price was too high. Cameron considered Jared Leto for the role, but Leto refused to audition. Jeremy Sisto did a series of screen tests with Winslet and three other actresses vying for the role of Rose. DiCaprio, 21 years old at the time, was brought to Cameron's attention by casting director Mali Finn. Initially, he did not want the role and refused to read his first romantic scene (see below). Cameron said, "He read it once, then started goofing around, and I could never get him to focus on it again. But for one split second, a shaft of light came down from the heavens and lit up the forest." Cameron strongly believed in DiCaprio's acting ability and told him, "Look, I'm not going to make this guy brooding and neurotic. I'm not going to give him a tic and a limp and all the things you want." Cameron envisioned the character as being like those played by James Stewart or Gregory Peck. Although Jack Dawson was a fictional character, in Fairview Cemetery in Halifax, Nova Scotia, where 121 victims are buried, there is a grave labeled "J. Dawson". The real J. Dawson was Joseph Dawson, a trimmer in the engine room. "It wasn't until after the movie came out that we found out that there was a J. Dawson gravestone," said the film's producer, Jon Landau, in an interview.
 Billy Zane as Caledon Hockley: Caledon is Rose's arrogant and snobbish 30-year-old fiancé, who is the heir to a Pittsburgh steel fortune. He becomes increasingly embarrassed by, jealous of, and cruel about Rose's affection for Jack. The part was originally offered to Matthew McConaughey, and Rob Lowe has also gone on the record as having pursued it.
 Frances Fisher as Ruth DeWitt Bukater: Rose's widowed mother, who arranges her daughter's engagement to Cal to maintain her family's high-society status. Like many aristocratic passengers portrayed in the film, her disposition is elitist and frivolous. She loves her daughter but believes that social position is more important than having a loving marriage. She strongly dislikes Jack, even though he saved her daughter's life.
 Gloria Stuart as Rose Dawson Calvert: Rose narrates the film in a modern-day framing device. Cameron stated, "In order to see the present and the past, I decided to create a fictional survivor who is [close to] 101 years, and she connects us in a way through history." The 100-year-old Rose gives Lovett information regarding the "Heart of the Ocean" after he discovers a nude drawing of her in the wreck. She shares the story of her time aboard the ship, and speaks about her relationship with Jack for the first time since the sinking. At 87, Stuart had to be made up to look older for the role. Of casting Stuart, Cameron stated, "My casting director found her. She was sent out on a mission to find retired actresses from the Golden Age of the thirties and forties." Cameron said that he did not know who Stuart was, and Fay Wray was also considered for the role. "But [Stuart] was just so into it, and so lucid, and had such a great spirit. And I saw the connection between her spirit and [Winslet's] spirit," stated Cameron. "I saw this joie de vivre in both of them, that I thought the audience would be able to make that cognitive leap that it's the same person."
 Bill Paxton as Brock Lovett: A treasure hunter looking for the "Heart of the Ocean" in the wreck of the Titanic in the present. Time and funding for his expedition are running out. He later reflects at the film's conclusion that, despite thinking about Titanic for three years, he has never understood it until he hears Rose's story.
 Suzy Amis as Lizzy Calvert: Rose's granddaughter, who accompanies her when she visits Lovett on the ship and learns of her grandmother's romantic past with Jack Dawson.
 Danny Nucci as Fabrizio: Jack's Italian best friend, who boards the RMS Titanic with him after Jack wins two tickets in a poker game. Fabrizio fails to board a lifeboat when the Titanic sinks and is killed when one of the ship's funnels breaks and crashes into the water, crushing him and several other passengers to death.
 David Warner as Spicer Lovejoy: An ex-Pinkerton constable, Lovejoy is Cal's English valet and bodyguard, who keeps an eye on Rose and is suspicious about the circumstances surrounding Jack rescuing her. He dies when the Titanic splits in half, causing him to fall into a massive opening. Warner had appeared in the 1979 TV miniseries S.O.S. Titanic.
 Jason Barry as Tommy Ryan: An Irish third-class passenger who befriends Jack and Fabrizio. Tommy is killed when he is accidentally pushed forward and shot by a panicked First Officer Murdoch.

Historical characters
Although not intended to be an entirely accurate depiction of events, the film includes portrayals of several historical figures:

 Kathy Bates as Margaret "Molly" Brown: Brown is looked down upon by other first-class women, including Ruth, as "vulgar" and "new money". She is friendly to Jack and lends him a suit of evening clothes (bought for her son) when he is invited to dinner in the first-class dining saloon. She was dubbed "The Unsinkable Molly Brown" by historians because, with the support of other women, she commandeered Lifeboat 6 from Quartermaster Robert Hichens. Some aspects of this altercation are portrayed in Cameron's film. Reba McEntire was offered the role, but had to turn it down, because it conflicted with her touring schedule.
 Victor Garber as Thomas Andrews: The ship's builder, Andrews is portrayed as a kind, decent man who is modest about his grand achievement. After the collision, he tries to convince the others, particularly Ismay, that it is a "mathematical certainty" that the ship will sink. He is depicted during the sinking of the ship as standing next to the clock in the first-class smoking room, lamenting his failure to build a strong and safe ship. Although this has become one of the most famous legends of the sinking of the Titanic, this story, which was published in a 1912 book (Thomas Andrews: Shipbuilder) and therefore perpetuated, came from John Stewart, a steward on the ship who in fact left the ship in boat no.15 at approximately 1:40 a.m. There were testimonies of sightings of Andrews after that moment. It appears that Andrews stayed in the smoking room for some time to gather his thoughts, then he continued assisting with the evacuation. 
 Bernard Hill as Captain Edward John Smith: Smith planned to make the Titanic his final voyage before retiring. He retreats into the wheelhouse on the bridge as the ship sinks, dying when the windows implode from the water whilst he clings to the ship's wheel. There are conflicting accounts as to whether he died in this manner or later froze to death in the water near the capsized collapsible lifeboat "B".
 Jonathan Hyde as J. Bruce Ismay: White Star Line's ignorant, boorish managing director, who influences Captain Smith to go faster with the prospect of an earlier arrival in New York and favorable press attention; while this action appears in popular portrayals of the disaster, it is unsupported by evidence. After the collision, he struggles to comprehend that his "unsinkable" ship is doomed. Ismay later boards Collapsible C (one of the last lifeboats to leave the ship) just before it is lowered. He was branded a coward by the press and public for surviving the disaster while many women and children had drowned.
 Eric Braeden as John Jacob Astor IV: A first-class passenger whom Rose (correctly) calls the richest man on the ship. The film depicts Astor and his 18-year-old wife Madeleine (Charlotte Chatton) as being introduced to Jack by Rose in the first-class dining saloon. During the introduction, Astor asks if Jack is connected to the "Boston Dawsons", a question Jack deflects by saying that he is instead affiliated with the Chippewa Falls Dawsons. Astor is last seen as the Grand Staircase glass dome implodes and water surges in.
 Bernard Fox as Colonel Archibald Gracie IV: The film depicts Gracie making a comment to Cal that "women and machinery don't mix", and congratulating Jack for saving Rose from falling off the ship, though he is unaware that it was a suicide attempt. He is later seen offering to lead Jack and Rose to the remaining lifeboats during the sinking. Fox had portrayed Frederick Fleet in the 1958 film A Night to Remember.
 Michael Ensign as Benjamin Guggenheim: A mining magnate traveling in first-class. He shows off his French mistress Madame Aubert (Fannie Brett) to his fellow passengers while his wife and three daughters wait for him at home. When Jack joins the other first-class passengers for dinner after his rescue of Rose, Guggenheim refers to him as a "bohemian". He is seen in the flooding Grand Staircase during the sinking, saying he is prepared to go down as a gentleman.

 Jonathan Evans-Jones as Wallace Hartley: The ship's bandmaster and violinist who plays uplifting music with his colleagues on the boat deck as the ship sinks. As the final plunge begins, he leads the band in a final performance of "Nearer, My God, to Thee", to the tune of Bethany, and dies in the sinking.
 Mark Lindsay Chapman as Chief Officer Henry Wilde: The ship's chief officer, who lets Cal on board a lifeboat because he has a child in his arms. Before he dies, he tries to get the boats to return to the sinking site to rescue passengers by blowing his whistle. After he freezes to death, Rose uses his whistle to attract the attention of Fifth Officer Lowe, which leads to her rescue.
 Ewan Stewart as First Officer William Murdoch: The officer who is put in charge of the bridge on the night the ship struck the iceberg. During a rush for the lifeboats, Murdoch shoots Tommy Ryan, as well as another passenger, in a momentary panic, then commits suicide by shooting himself in the head. When Murdoch's nephew Scott saw the film, he objected to his uncle's portrayal as damaging to Murdoch's heroic reputation. A few months later, Fox vice-president Scott Neeson went to Dalbeattie, Scotland, where Murdoch lived, to deliver a personal apology, and also presented a £5000 donation to Dalbeattie High School to boost the school's William Murdoch Memorial Prize. Cameron apologized on the DVD commentary, but stated that there were officers who fired gunshots to enforce the "women and children first" policy. According to Cameron, his depiction of Murdoch is that of an "honorable man," not of a man "gone bad" or of a "cowardly murderer." He added, "I'm not sure you'd find that same sense of responsibility and total devotion to duty today. This guy had half of his lifeboats launched before his counterpart on the port side had even launched one. That says something about character and heroism."
 Jonathan Phillips as Second Officer Charles Lightoller. Lightoller took charge of the port side evacuation. The film depicts Lightoller informing Captain Smith that it will be difficult to see icebergs without breaking water, and following the collision, suggesting the crew should begin boarding women and children to the lifeboats. He is seen brandishing a gun and threatening to use it to keep order. He can be seen on top of Collapsible B when the first funnel collapses. Lightoller was the most senior officer to have survived the disaster.
 Simon Crane as Fourth Officer Joseph Boxhall: The officer in charge of firing flares and manning Lifeboat 2 during the sinking. He is shown on the bridge wings helping the seamen firing the flares.
 Ioan Gruffudd as Fifth Officer Harold Lowe: The ship's only officer to lead a lifeboat to retrieve survivors of the sinking from the icy waters. The film depicts Lowe rescuing Rose.
 Edward Fletcher as Sixth Officer James Moody: The ship's only junior officer to have died in the sinking. The film depicts Moody admitting Jack and Fabrizio onto the ship only moments before it departs from Southampton. Moody is later shown following Murdoch's orders to put the ship to full speed ahead, and informs Murdoch about the iceberg. He is last seen clinging to one of the davits on the starboard side after having unsuccessfully attempted to launch collapsible A.
 James Lancaster as Father Thomas Byles: Second-class passenger Father Byles, a Catholic priest from England, is portrayed praying and consoling passengers during the ship's final moments.
 Lew Palter and Elsa Raven as Isidor and Ida Straus: Isidor is a former owner of R.H. Macy and Company, a former congressman from New York, and a member of the New York and New Jersey Bridge Commission. During the sinking, his wife Ida is offered a place in a lifeboat, but refuses, saying that she will honor her wedding pledge by staying with Isidor. They are last seen lying on their bed embracing each other as water fills their stateroom.
 Martin Jarvis as Sir Cosmo Duff-Gordon: A Scottish baronet who is rescued in Lifeboat 1. Lifeboats 1 and 2 were emergency boats with a capacity of 40. Situated at the forward end of the boat deck, these were kept ready to launch in case of a person falling overboard. On the night of the disaster, Lifeboat 1 was the fourth to be launched, with 12 people aboard, including Duff-Gordon, his wife and her secretary. The baronet was much criticized for his conduct during the incident. It was suggested that he had boarded the emergency boat in violation of the "women and children first" policy, and that the boat had failed to return to rescue those struggling in the water. He offered five pounds to each of the lifeboat's crew, which those critical of his conduct viewed as a bribe. The Duff-Gordons at the time (and his wife's secretary in a letter written at the time and rediscovered in 2007) stated that there had been no women or children waiting to board in the vicinity of the launching of their boat; there is confirmation that lifeboat 1 of the Titanic was almost empty, and that First Officer William Murdoch was apparently glad to offer Duff-Gordon and his wife and her secretary a place (simply to fill it) after they had asked if they could get on. Duff-Gordon denied that his offer of money to the lifeboat crew represented a bribe. The British Board of Trade's inquiry into the disaster accepted Duff-Gordon's denial of bribing the crew, but maintained that, if the emergency boat had rowed towards the people who were in the water, it might very well have been able to rescue some of them.
 Rosalind Ayres as Lady Duff-Gordon: A world-famous fashion designer and Sir Cosmo's wife. She is rescued in Lifeboat 1 with her husband. They never lived down rumors that they had forbidden the lifeboat's crew to return to the wreck site in case they would be swamped.
 Rochelle Rose as Noël Leslie, Countess of Rothes: The Countess is shown to be friendly with Cal and the DeWitt Bukaters. Despite being of a higher status in society than Sir Cosmo and Lady Duff-Gordon, she is kind, and helps row the boat and even looks after the steerage passengers.
 Scott G. Anderson as Frederick Fleet: The lookout who saw the iceberg. Fleet escapes the sinking ship aboard Lifeboat 6.
 Paul Brightwell as Quartermaster Robert Hichens: One of the ship's six quartermasters and at the ship's wheel at the time of collision. He is in charge of lifeboat 6. He refuses to go back and pick up survivors after the sinking and eventually the boat is commandeered by Molly Brown.
 Martin East as Reginald Lee: The other lookout in the crow's nest. He survives the sinking.
 Gregory Cooke as Jack Phillips: Senior wireless operator on board the Titanic whom Captain Smith ordered to send the distress signal.
 Craig Kelly as Harold Bride: Junior wireless operator on board the Titanic.
 Liam Tuohy as Chief Baker Charles Joughin: The baker appears in the film helping Rose stand up after she falls, following her and Jack to the ship's stern, and finally hanging onto the ship's railing as it sinks, drinking brandy from a flask. According to the real Joughin's testimony, he rode the ship down and stepped into the water without getting his hair wet. He also admitted to hardly feeling the cold, most likely thanks to alcohol. In a deleted scene, he's shown throwing deckchairs overboard before taking a drink from his bottle.
 Terry Forrestal as Chief Engineer Joseph G. Bell: Bell and his men worked until the last minute to keep the lights and the power on in order for distress signals to get out. Bell and all of the engineers died in the bowels of the Titanic.

Cameos
Several crew members of the Akademik Mstislav Keldysh appear in the film, including Anatoly Sagalevich, creator and pilot of the Mir self-propelled Deep Submergence Vehicle. Anders Falk, who filmed a documentary about the film's sets for the Titanic Historical Society, makes a cameo appearance in the film as a Swedish immigrant whom Jack Dawson meets when he enters his cabin; Edward Kamuda and Karen Kamuda, then President and Vice President of the Society, who served as film consultants, were cast as extras in the film.

Pre-production

Writing and inspiration

James Cameron has long had a fascination with shipwrecks, and for him the RMS Titanic was "the Mount Everest of shipwrecks". He was almost past the point in his life when he felt he could consider an undersea expedition, but said he still had "a mental restlessness" to live the life he had turned away from when he switched from the sciences to the arts in college. So when an IMAX film was made from footage shot of the wreck itself, he decided to seek Hollywood funding to "pay for an expedition and do the same thing". It was "not because I particularly wanted to make the movie," Cameron said. "I wanted to dive to the shipwreck."

Cameron wrote a scriptment for a Titanic film, met with 20th Century Fox executives including Peter Chernin, and pitched it as "Romeo and Juliet on the Titanic". Cameron stated, "They were like, 'Oooooohkaaaaaay – a three-hour romantic epic? Sure, that's just what we want. Is there a little bit of Terminator in that? Any Harrier jets, shoot-outs, or car chases?' I said, 'No, no, no. It's not like that. The studio was dubious about the idea's commercial prospects, but, hoping for a long-term relationship with Cameron, they gave him a greenlight.

Cameron convinced Fox to promote the film based on the publicity afforded by shooting the Titanic wreck itself, and organized several dives to the site over a period of two years. "My pitch on that had to be a little more detailed," said Cameron. "So I said, 'Look, we've got to do this whole opening where they're exploring the Titanic and they find the diamond, so we're going to have all these shots of the ship." Cameron stated, "Now, we can either do them with elaborate models and motion control shots and CG and all that, which will cost X amount of money – or we can spend X plus 30 per cent and actually go shoot it at the real wreck."

The crew shot at the real wreck in the Atlantic Ocean twelve times in 1995. At that depth, with a water pressure of 6,000 pounds per square inch, "one small flaw in the vessel's superstructure would mean instant death for all on board." Not only were the dives high-risk, but adverse conditions prevented Cameron from getting the high-quality footage that he wanted. During one dive, one of the submersibles collided with Titanics hull, damaging both sub and ship, and leaving fragments of the submersible's propeller shroud scattered around the superstructure. The external bulkhead of Captain Smith's quarters collapsed, exposing the interior. The area around the entrance to the Grand Staircase was also damaged.

Descending to the actual site made both Cameron and crew want "to live up to that level of reality ... But there was another level of reaction coming away from the real wreck, which was that it wasn't just a story, it wasn't just a drama," he said. "It was an event that happened to real people who really died. Working around the wreck for so much time, you get such a strong sense of the profound sadness and injustice of it, and the message of it." Cameron stated, "You think, 'There probably aren't going to be many filmmakers who go to Titanic. There may never be another one – maybe a documentarian." Due to this, he felt "a great mantle of responsibility to convey the emotional message of it – to do that part of it right, too".

After filming the underwater shots, Cameron began writing the screenplay. He wanted to honor the people who died during the sinking, so he spent six months researching all of the Titanics crew and passengers. "I read everything I could. I created an extremely detailed timeline of the ship's few days and a very detailed timeline of the last night of its life," he said. "And I worked within that to write the script, and I got some historical experts to analyze what I'd written and comment on it, and I adjusted it." He paid meticulous attention to detail, even including a scene depicting the Californians role in Titanic demise, though this was later cut. From the beginning of the shoot, they had "a very clear picture" of what happened on the ship that night. "I had a library that filled one whole wall of my writing office with Titanic stuff, because I wanted it to be right, especially if we were going to dive to the ship," he said. "That set the bar higher in a way – it elevated the movie in a sense. We wanted this to be a definitive visualization of this moment in history as if you'd gone back in a time machine and shot it."

Cameron was influenced in his crafting of the film by the 1958 British production A Night to Remember, which he had seen as a youth. He liberally copied some dialogue and scenes from that film, including the lively party of the passengers in steerage, and the musicians playing on the deck during the sinking of the ship.

Cameron felt the Titanic sinking was "like a great novel that really happened", but that the event had become a mere morality tale; the film would give audiences the experience of living the history. The treasure hunter Brock Lovett represented those who never connected with the human element of the tragedy, while the blossoming romance of Jack and Rose, Cameron believed, would be the most engaging part of the story: when their love is finally destroyed, the audience would mourn the loss. He said: "All my films are love stories, but in Titanic I finally got the balance right. It's not a disaster film. It's a love story with a fastidious overlay of real history."

Cameron framed the romance with the elderly Rose to make the intervening years palpable and poignant. While Winslet and Stuart stated their belief that, instead of being asleep in her bed, the character dies at the end of the film, Cameron said that he would rather not reveal what he intended with the ending because "[t]he answer has to be something you supply personally; individually."

Scale modeling

Harland and Wolff, the RMS Titanic builders, opened their private archives to the crew, sharing blueprints that were previously thought lost. For the ship's interiors, production designer Peter Lamont's team looked for artifacts from the era. The newness of the ship meant every prop had to be made from scratch. Fox acquired 40 acres of waterfront south of Playas de Rosarito in Mexico, and began building a new studio on May 31, 1996. A horizon tank of seventeen million gallons was built for the exterior of the reconstructed ship, providing 270 degrees of ocean view. The ship was built to full scale, but Lamont removed redundant sections on the superstructure and forward well deck for the ship to fit in the tank, with the remaining sections filled with digital models. The lifeboats and funnels were shrunken by ten percent. The boat deck and A-deck were working sets, but the rest of the ship was just steel plating. Within was a fifty-foot lifting platform for the ship to tilt during the sinking sequences. The 60 foot 1/8th scale model of the stern section was designed by naval architect Jay Kantola utilizing plans of the Titanic sister ship RMS Olympic.

The sets representing the interior rooms of the Titanic were reproduced exactly as originally built, using photographs and plans from the Titanic builders. The Grand Staircase, which features prominently in the film, was recreated to a high standard of authenticity, though it was widened 30% compared to the original and reinforced with steel girders. Craftsmen from Mexico and Britain sculpted the ornate paneling and plaster-work based on Titanic original designs. The carpeting, upholstery, individual pieces of furniture, light fixtures, chairs, cutlery and crockery with the White Star Line crest on each piece were among the objects recreated according to original designs. Cameron additionally hired two Titanic historians, Don Lynch and Ken Marschall, to authenticate the historical detail in the film.

Production
Principal photography for Titanic began on July 31, 1996 at Dartmouth, Nova Scotia, with the filming of the modern-day expedition scenes aboard the Akademik Mstislav Keldysh. In September 1996, the production moved to the newly built Fox Baja Studios in Rosarito, Mexico, where a full-scale RMS Titanic had been constructed. The poop deck was built on a hinge that could rise from zero to 90 degrees in a few seconds, just as the ship's stern rose during the sinking. For the safety of the stuntmen, many props were made of foam rubber. By November 15, the boarding scenes were being shot. Cameron chose to build his RMS Titanic on the starboard side as a study of weather data revealed it was a prevailing north-to-south wind, which blew the funnel smoke aft. This posed a problem for shooting the ship's departure from Southampton, as it was docked on its port side. Implementation of written directions, as well as props and costumes, had to be reversed; for example, if someone walked to their right in the script, they had to walk left during shooting. In post-production, the film was flipped to the correct direction.

A full-time etiquette coach was hired to instruct the cast in the manners of the upper class gentility in 1912. Despite this, several critics picked up on anachronisms in the film, not least involving the two main stars.

Cameron sketched Jack's nude portrait of Rose for a scene which he feels has the backdrop of repression. "You know what it means for her, the freedom she must be feeling. It's kind of exhilarating for that reason," he said. The nude scene was DiCaprio and Winslet's first scene together. "It wasn't by any kind of design, although I couldn't have designed it better. There's a nervousness and an energy and a hesitance in them," Cameron stated. "They had rehearsed together, but they hadn't shot anything together. If I'd had a choice, I probably would have preferred to put it deeper into the body of the shoot." Cameron said he and his crew "were just trying to find things to shoot" because the big set "wasn't ready for months, so we were scrambling around trying to fill in anything we could get to shoot." After seeing the scene on film, Cameron felt it worked out considerably well.

Other times on the set were not as smooth. The shoot was an arduous experience that "cemented Cameron's formidable reputation as 'the scariest man in Hollywood'. He became known as an uncompromising, hard-charging perfectionist" and a "300-decibel screamer, a modern-day Captain Bligh with a megaphone and walkie-talkie, swooping down into people's faces on a 162ft crane". Winslet chipped a bone in her elbow during filming and had been worried that she would drown in the 17m-gallon water tank in which the ship was to be sunk. "There were times when I was genuinely frightened of him. Jim has a temper like you wouldn't believe," she said. "'God damn it!' he would yell at some poor crew member, 'that's exactly what I didn't want!'" Her co-star, Bill Paxton, was familiar with Cameron's work ethic from his earlier experience with him. "There were a lot of people on the set. Jim is not one of those guys who has the time to win hearts and minds," he said. The crew felt Cameron had an evil alter ego and so nicknamed him "Mij" (Jim spelled backwards). In response to the criticism, Cameron stated, "Film-making is war. A great battle between business and aesthetics."

On August 9, 1996, during the Akademik Mstislav Keldysh shoot in Canada, an unknown person, likely a crew member, put the dissociative drug PCP into the soup that Cameron and various others ate one night in Dartmouth, Nova Scotia. It sent more than 50 people to the hospital, including Paxton. "There were people just rolling around, completely out of it. Some of them said they were seeing streaks and psychedelics," said actor Lewis Abernathy. Cameron managed to vomit before the drug took a full hold. Abernathy was shocked at the way he looked. "One eye was completely red, like the Terminator eye. A pupil, no iris, beet red. The other eye looked like he'd been sniffing glue since he was four." The Nova Scotia Department of Health confirmed that the soup had contained PCP on August 27, and the Halifax Regional Police Service announced a criminal investigation the next day. The investigation was closed in February 1999. The person behind the poisoning was never caught.

The filming schedule was intended to last 138 days but grew to 160 (officially wrapped on March 23, 1997). Many cast members came down with colds, flu, or kidney infections after spending hours in cold water, including Winslet. In the end, she decided she would not work with Cameron again unless she earned "a lot of money". Several others left the production, and three stuntmen broke their bones, but the Screen Actors Guild decided, following an investigation, that nothing was inherently unsafe about the set. Additionally, DiCaprio said there was no point when he felt he was in danger during filming. Cameron believed in a passionate work ethic and never apologized for the way he ran his sets, although he acknowledged:

The costs of filming Titanic eventually began to mount and finally reached $200 million, a bit over $1 million per minute of screen time. Fox executives panicked and suggested an hour of specific cuts from the three-hour film. They argued the extended length would mean fewer showings, thus less revenue, even though long epics are more likely to help directors win Oscars. Cameron refused, telling Fox, "You want to cut my movie? You're going to have to fire me! You want to fire me? You're going to have to kill me!" The executives did not want to start over, because it would mean the loss of their entire investment, but they also initially rejected Cameron's offer of forfeiting his share of the profits as an empty gesture, as they predicted profits would be unlikely. Worried about surmounting costs, Fox wanted to find a partner studio to co-finance the film; Fox approached Paramount Pictures in May 1996, and the two studios agreed to split the costs and distribution rights. Fox retained the international distribution rights and sold the domestic rights to Paramount in return for $65 million, in an effort to recoup their investment.

Cameron explained forfeiting his share as complex. "...the short version is that the film cost proportionally much more than T2 and True Lies. Those films went up seven or eight percent from the initial budget. Titanic also had a large budget to begin with, but it went up a lot more," he said. "As the producer and director, I take responsibility for the studio that's writing the checks, so I made it less painful for them. I did that on two different occasions. They didn't force me to do it; they were glad that I did."

Post-production

Effects
iCameron wanted to push the boundary of special effects with his film, and enlisted Digital Domain and Pacific Data Images to continue the developments in digital technology which the director pioneered while working on The Abyss and Terminator 2: Judgment Day. Many previous films about the RMS Titanic shot water in slow motion, which did not look wholly convincing. Cameron encouraged his crew to shoot their  miniature of the ship as if "we're making a commercial for the White Star Line". Afterwards, digital water and smoke were added, as were extras captured on a motion capture stage. Visual effects supervisor Rob Legato scanned the faces of many actors, including himself and his children, for the digital extras and stuntmen. There was also a  model of the ship's stern that could break in two repeatedly, the only miniature to be used in water. For scenes set in the ship's engines, footage of the SS Jeremiah O'Briens engines were composited with miniature support frames, and actors shot against a greenscreen. In order to save money, the first-class lounge was a miniature set incorporated into a greenscreen backdrop behind the actors. The miniature of the Lounge would later be crushed to simulate the destruction of the room and a scale model of a First-Class corridor flooded with jets of water while the camera pans out.

An enclosed  tank was used for sinking interiors, in which the entire set could be tilted into the water. In order to sink the Grand Staircase,  of water were dumped into the set as it was lowered into the tank. Unexpectedly, the waterfall ripped the staircase from its steel-reinforced foundations, although no one was hurt. The  exterior of the RMS Titanic had its first half lowered into the tank, but as the heaviest part of the ship it acted as a shock absorber against the water; to get the set into the water, Cameron had much of the set emptied and even smashed some of the promenade windows himself. After submerging the dining saloon, three days were spent shooting Lovett's ROV traversing the wreck in the present. The post-sinking scenes in the freezing Atlantic were shot in a  tank, where the frozen corpses were created by applying on actors a powder that crystallized when exposed to water, and wax was coated on hair and clothes.

The climactic scene, which features the breakup of the ship directly before it sinks as well as its final plunge to the bottom of the Atlantic, involved a tilting full-sized set, 150 extras, and 100 stunt performers. Cameron criticized previous Titanic films for depicting the liner's final plunge as a graceful slide underwater. He "wanted to depict it as the terrifyingly chaotic event that it really was". When carrying out the sequence, people needed to fall off the increasingly tilting deck, plunging hundreds of feet below and bouncing off of railings and propellers on the way down. A few attempts to film this sequence with stunt people resulted in some minor injuries, and Cameron halted the more dangerous stunts. The risks were eventually minimized "by using computer-generated people for the dangerous falls".

A Linux-based operating system was utilized for the creation of the effects.

Editing
There was one "crucial historical fact" Cameron chose to omit from the film – the SS Californian was close to the Titanic the night she sank but had turned off its radio for the night, did not hear her crew's SOS calls, and did not respond to their distress flares. "Yes, the [SS] Californian. That wasn't a compromise to mainstream filmmaking. That was really more about emphasis, creating an emotional truth to the film," stated Cameron. He said there were aspects of retelling the sinking that seemed important in pre- and post-production, but turned out to be less important as the film evolved. "The story of the Californian was in there; we even shot a scene of them switching off their Marconi radio set," said Cameron. "But I took it out. It was a clean cut, because it focuses you back onto that world. If Titanic is powerful as a metaphor, as a microcosm, for the end of the world in a sense, then that world must be self-contained."

During the first assembly cut, Cameron altered the planned ending, which had given resolution to Brock Lovett's story. In the original version of the ending, Brock and Lizzy see the elderly Rose at the stern of the boat and fear she is going to commit suicide. Rose then reveals that she had the "Heart of the Ocean" diamond all along but never sold it, in order to live on her own without Cal's money. She tells Brock that life is priceless and throws the diamond into the ocean, after allowing him to hold it. After accepting that treasure is worthless, Brock laughs at his stupidity. Rose then goes back to her cabin to sleep, whereupon the film ends in the same way as the final version. In the editing room, Cameron decided that by this point, the audience would no longer be interested in Brock Lovett and cut the resolution to his story, so that Rose is alone when she drops the diamond. He also did not want to disrupt the audience's melancholy after the Titanic sinking. Paxton agreed that his scene with Brock's epiphany and laugh was unnecessary, stating that "I would have shot heroin to make the scene work better... you didn't really need anything from us. Our job was done by then... If you're smart and you take the ego and the narcissism out of it, you'll listen to the film, and the film will tell you what it needs and what it does not need".

The version used for the first test screening featured a fight between Jack and Lovejoy which takes place after Jack and Rose escape into the flooded dining saloon, but the test audiences disliked it. The scene was written to give the film more suspense, and featured Cal (falsely) offering to give Lovejoy, his valet, the "Heart of the Ocean" if he can get it from Jack and Rose. Lovejoy goes after the pair in the sinking first-class dining room. Just as they are about to escape him, Lovejoy notices Rose's hand slap the water as it slips off the table behind which she is hiding. In revenge for framing him for the "theft" of the necklace, Jack attacks him and smashes his head against a glass window, which explains the gash on Lovejoy's head that can be seen when he dies in the completed version of the film. In their reactions to the scene, test audiences said it would be unrealistic to risk one's life for wealth, and Cameron cut it for this reason, as well as for timing and pacing reasons. Many other scenes were cut for similar reasons.

Heart of the Ocean
For the Heart of the Ocean design, London-based jewelers Asprey & Garrard used cubic zirconias set in white gold to create an Edwardian-style necklace to be used as a prop in the film. Asprey & Garrard produced and designed the necklaces: the result was three different and unique designs. Two of their designs were used in the film while the other went unused until after the film had been released. The three necklaces are commonly known as the original prop, the J. Peterman necklace, and the Asprey necklace. The three necklaces are all very similar but have distinguishable differences.

The third and final design was not used in the film. After the film's success, Asprey & Garrard were commissioned to create an authentic Heart of the Ocean necklace using the original design. The result was a platinum-set,  heart-shaped Ceylon sapphire surrounded by 103 diamonds. This design featured a much larger inverted pear-shaped Ceylon sapphire with a subtle cleft to resemble a heart. The chain for this necklace also featured a mix of round, pear, and marquise cut white diamonds. The bail also featured a heart cut white diamond with another round cut diamond attached to an inverted pear shape diamond which was then attached to the cage of the main stone. The necklace was donated to Sotheby's auction house in Beverly Hills for an auction benefiting the Diana, Princess of Wales Memorial Fund and Southern California's Aid For AIDS. It was sold to an unidentified Asprey client for $1.4 million, under the agreement that Dion would wear it two nights later at the 1998 Academy Awards ceremony. This necklace has since not been made available for public viewing.

Soundtrack

Cameron wrote Titanic while listening to the work of Irish new-age musician Enya. He offered Enya the chance to compose for the film, but she declined. Cameron instead chose James Horner to compose the film's score. The two had parted ways after a tumultuous working experience on Aliens, but Titanic cemented a successful collaboration that lasted until Horner's death. For the vocals heard throughout the film, subsequently described by Earle Hitchner of The Wall Street Journal as "evocative", Horner chose Norwegian singer Sissel Kyrkjebø, commonly known as "Sissel". Horner knew Sissel from her album Innerst i sjelen, and he particularly liked how she sang "Eg veit i himmerik ei borg" ("I Know in Heaven There Is a Castle"). He had tried twenty-five or thirty singers before he finally chose Sissel as the voice to create specific moods within the film.

Horner additionally wrote the song "My Heart Will Go On" in secret with Will Jennings because Cameron did not want any songs with singing in the film. Céline Dion agreed to record a demo with the persuasion of her husband René Angélil. Horner waited until Cameron was in an appropriate mood before presenting him with the song. After playing it several times, Cameron declared his approval, although worried that he would have been criticized for "going commercial at the end of the movie". Cameron also wanted to appease anxious studio executives and "saw that a hit song from his movie could only be a positive factor in guaranteeing its completion".

Release

Initial screening
Distribution for the film was split between Paramount and Fox; the former handling the distribution in the United States and Canada, and the latter handling the international release. Both studios expected Cameron to complete the film for a release on July 2, 1997. The film was to be released on this date "to exploit the lucrative summer season ticket sales when blockbuster films usually do better". In April, Cameron said the film's special effects were too complicated and that releasing the film for summer would not be possible. With production delays, Paramount pushed back the release date to December 19, 1997. "This fueled speculation that the film itself was a disaster." A preview screening in Minneapolis on July 14 "generated positive reviews" and "[c]hatter on the internet was responsible for more favorable word of mouth about the [film]". This eventually led to more positive media coverage.

Cameron refused to hold the film's world premiere in Los Angeles. Paramount disagreed with Cameron's decision, but Fox acquiesced and went ahead and held the premiere on November 1, 1997, at the Tokyo International Film Festival, where reaction was described as "tepid" by The New York Times. Positive reviews started to appear back in the United States; the official Hollywood premiere occurred on December 14, 1997, where "the big movie stars who attended the opening were enthusiastically gushing about the film to the world media".

Box office
Including revenue from the 2012, 2017 and 2023 reissues, Titanic earned $674.3 million in North America and $1.575 billion in other countries, for a worldwide total of $2.249 billion. It became the highest-grossing film of all time worldwide in 1998, beating Jurassic Park (1993). The film remained so for twelve years, until Avatar (2009), also written and directed by Cameron, surpassed it in 2010. On March 1, 1998, it became the first film to earn more than $1 billion worldwide and on the weekend April 13–15, 2012—a century after the original vessel's foundering, Titanic became the second film to cross the $2 billion threshold during its 3D re-release. Box Office Mojo estimates that Titanic is the fifth-highest-grossing film of all time in North America when adjusting for ticket price inflation. The site also estimates that the film sold over 128 million tickets in the US in its initial theatrical run.

Titanic was the first foreign-language film to succeed in India, which claims to have the largest movie-going audience in the world. A Hindustan Times report attributes this to the film's similarities and shared themes with most Bollywood films.

Initial theatrical run
The film received steady attendance after opening in North America on Friday, December 19, 1997. By the end of that same weekend, theaters were beginning to sell out. The film earned $8,658,814 on its opening day and $28,638,131 over the opening weekend from 2,674 theaters, averaging to about $10,710 per venue, and ranking number one at the box office, ahead of Mouse Hunt, Scream 2 and the eighteenth James Bond film, Tomorrow Never Dies. It would go on to surpass The Godfather Part IIIs record for having the highest Christmas Day gross, generating a total of $9.2 million. For its second weekend, the film made $35.6 million, making it the biggest December weekend gross, surpassing Scream 2. By New Year's Day, Titanic had made over $120 million, had increased in popularity and theaters continued to sell out. In just 44 days, it became the fastest film to approach the $300 million mark at the domestic box office, surpassing the former record held by Jurassic Park, which took 67 days to do so. Titanic would hold this record until 1999 when it was taken by Star Wars: Episode I – The Phantom Menace. Its highest grossing single day was Saturday, February 14, 1998, on which it earned $13,048,711, more than eight weeks after its North American debut. On March 14, it surpassed Star Wars as the highest-grossing film ever in North America. It stayed at number one for 15 consecutive weeks in North America, a record for any film. By April 1998, the film's number one spot would be overtaken by Lost in Space, dropping into second place. Outside North America, the film made double its North American gross, generating $1,242,413,080 and accumulating a grand total of $1,843,201,268 worldwide from its initial theatrical run.

Commercial analysis
Before Titanics release, various film critics predicted the film would be a significant disappointment at the box office, especially since it was the most expensive film ever made at the time. When it was shown to the press in autumn of 1997, "it was with massive forebodings", since the "people in charge of the screenings believed they were on the verge of losing their jobs – because of this great albatross of a picture on which, finally, two studios had to combine to share the great load of its making". Cameron also thought he was "headed for disaster" at one point during filming. "We labored the last six months on Titanic in the absolute knowledge that the studio would lose $100 million. It was a certainty," he stated. As the film neared release, "particular venom was spat at Cameron for what was seen as his hubris and monumental extravagance". A film critic for the Los Angeles Times wrote that "Cameron's overweening pride has come close to capsizing this project" and that the film was "a hackneyed, completely derivative copy of old Hollywood romances".

When the film became a success, with an unprecedented box-office performance, it was credited for being a love story that captured its viewers' emotions. The film was playing on 3,200 screens ten weeks after it opened, and out of its fifteen straight weeks on top of the charts, jumped 43% in total sales in its ninth week of release. It earned over $20 million for each of its first 10 weekends, and after 14 weeks was still bringing in more than $1 million on weekdays. 20th Century Fox estimated that seven percent of American teenage girls had seen Titanic twice by its fifth week. Although young women who saw the film several times and subsequently caused "Leo-Mania" were often credited with having primarily propelled the film to its all-time box office record, other reports have attributed the film's success to positive word of mouth and repeat viewership due to the love story combined with the ground-breaking special effects. The Hollywood Reporter estimated that after a combined production and promotion cost of $487 million, the film turned a net profit of $1.4 billion, with a modern profit of as much as $4 billion after ancillary sources.

Titanics impact on men has also been especially credited. It is considered one of the films that make men cry, with MSNBC's Ian Hodder stating that men admire Jack's sense of adventure and his ambitious behavior to win over Rose, which contributes to their emotional attachment to Jack. The film's ability to make men cry was briefly parodied in the 2009 film Zombieland, where character Tallahassee (Woody Harrelson), when recalling the death of his young son, states: "I haven't cried like that since Titanic."

In 2010, the BBC analyzed the stigma over men crying during Titanic and films in general. "Middle-aged men are not 'supposed' to cry during movies," stated Finlo Rohrer of the website, citing the ending of Titanic as having generated such tears, adding that "men, if they have felt weepy during [this film], have often tried to be surreptitious about it." Professor Mary Beth Oliver, of Penn State University, stated, "For many men, there is a great deal of pressure to avoid expression of 'female' emotions like sadness and fear. From a very young age, males are taught that it is inappropriate to cry, and these lessons are often accompanied by a great deal of ridicule when the lessons aren't followed." Rohrer said, "Indeed, some men who might sneer at the idea of crying during Titanic will readily admit to becoming choked up during Saving Private Ryan or Platoon." For men in general, "the idea of sacrifice for a 'brother' is a more suitable source of emotion".

Scott Meslow of The Atlantic stated while Titanic initially seems to need no defense, given its success, it is considered a film "for 15-year-old girls" by its main detractors. He argued that dismissing Titanic as fodder for teenage girls fails to consider the film's accomplishment: "that [this] grandiose, 3+ hour historical romantic drama is a film for everyone—including teenage boys." Meslow stated that despite the film being ranked high by males under the age of 18, matching the ratings for teenage boy-targeted films like Iron Man, it is common for boys and men to deny liking Titanic. He acknowledged his own rejection of the film as a child while secretly loving it. "It's this collection of elements—the history, the romance, the action—that made (and continues to make) Titanic an irresistible proposition for audiences of all ages across the globe," he stated. "Titanic has flaws, but for all its legacy, it's better than its middlebrow reputation would have you believe. It's a great movie for 15-year-old girls, but that doesn't mean it's not a great movie for everyone else too."

Quotes in the film aided its popularity. Titanic catchphrase "I'm the king of the world!" became one of the film industry's more popular quotations. According to Richard Harris, a psychology professor at Kansas State University, who studied why people like to cite films in social situations, using film quotations in everyday conversation is similar to telling a joke and a way to form solidarity with others. "People are doing it to feel good about themselves, to make others laugh, to make themselves laugh", he said.

Cameron explained the film's success as having significantly benefited from the experience of sharing. "When people have an experience that's very powerful in the movie theatre, they want to go share it. They want to grab their friend and bring them, so that they can enjoy it," he said. "They want to be the person to bring them the news that this is something worth having in their life. That's how Titanic worked." Media Awareness Network stated, "The normal
repeat viewing rate for a blockbuster theatrical film is about 5%. The repeat rate for Titanic was over 20%." The box office receipts "were even more impressive" when factoring in "the film's 3-hour-and-14-minute length meant that it could only be shown three times a day compared to a normal movie's four showings". In response to this, "[m]any theatres started midnight showings and were rewarded with full houses until almost 3:30 am".

Titanic held the record for box office gross for 12 years. Cameron's follow-up film, Avatar, was considered the first film with a genuine chance at surpassing its worldwide gross, and did so in 2010. Various explanations for why the film was able to successfully challenge Titanic were given. For one, "Two-thirds of Titanic haul was earned overseas, and Avatar [tracked] similarly... Avatar opened in 106 markets globally and was no. 1 in all of them" and the markets "such as Russia, where Titanic saw modest receipts in 1997 and 1998, are white-hot today" with "more screens and moviegoers" than ever before. Brandon Gray, president of Box Office Mojo, said that while Avatar may beat Titanic revenue record, the film is unlikely to surpass Titanic in attendance. "Ticket prices were about $3 cheaper in the late 1990s." In December 2009, Cameron had stated, "I don't think it's realistic to try to topple Titanic off its perch. Some pretty good movies have come out in the last few years. Titanic just struck some kind of chord." In a January 2010 interview, he gave a different take on the matter once Avatar performance was easier to predict. "It's gonna happen. It's just a matter of time," he said.

Author Alexandra Keller, when analyzing Titanics success, stated that scholars could agree that the film's popularity "appears dependent on contemporary culture, on perceptions of history, on patterns of consumerism and globalization, as well as on those elements experienced filmgoers conventionally expect of juggernaut film events in the 1990s – awesome screen spectacle, expansive action, and, more rarely seen, engaging characters and epic drama."

Critical reception

Initial
Titanic garnered mostly positive reviews from film critics, and was positively reviewed by audiences and scholars, who commented on the film's cultural, historical, and political impacts. On review aggregator website Rotten Tomatoes, the film has an approval rating of 88% based on 250 reviews, with an average rating of 8/10. The site's critical consensus reads, "A mostly unqualified triumph for James Cameron, who offers a dizzying blend of spectacular visuals and old-fashioned melodrama." Metacritic, which assigned a weighted average score of 75 out of 100, based on 35 critics, reports the film has "generally favorable reviews". Audiences polled by CinemaScore gave the film a rare "A+" grade, one of fewer than 60 films in the history of the service from 1982 to 2011 to earn the score.

With regard to the film's overall design, Roger Ebert stated: "It is flawlessly crafted, intelligently constructed, strongly acted, and spellbinding... Movies like this are not merely difficult to make at all, but almost impossible to make well." He credited the "technical difficulties" with being "so daunting that it's a wonder when the filmmakers are also able to bring the drama and history into proportion" and "found [himself] convinced by both the story and the sad saga". He named it his ninth best film of 1997. On the television program Siskel & Ebert, the film received "two thumbs up" and was praised for its accuracy in recreating the ship's sinking; Ebert described the film as "a glorious Hollywood epic" and "well worth the wait," and Gene Siskel found Leonardo DiCaprio "captivating".

James Berardinelli stated: "Meticulous in detail, yet vast in scope and intent, Titanic is the kind of epic motion picture event that has become a rarity. You don't just watch Titanic, you experience it." It was named his second best film of 1997. Joseph McBride of Boxoffice Magazine concluded: "To describe Titanic as the greatest disaster movie ever made is to sell it short. James Cameron's recreation of the 1912 sinking of the 'unsinkable' liner is one of the most magnificent pieces of serious popular entertainment ever to emanate from Hollywood."

The romantic and emotionally charged aspects of the film were equally praised. Andrew L. Urban of Urban Cinefile said: "You will walk out of Titanic not talking about budget or running time, but of its enormous emotive power, big as the engines of the ship itself, determined as its giant propellers to gouge into your heart, and as lasting as the love story that propels it." Owen Gleiberman of Entertainment Weekly described the film as "a lush and terrifying spectacle of romantic doom. Writer-director James Cameron has restaged the defining catastrophe of the early 20th century on a human scale of such purified yearning and dread that he touches the deepest levels of popular moviemaking." Janet Maslin of The New York Times commented that "Cameron's magnificent Titanic is the first spectacle in decades that honestly invites comparison to Gone With the Wind." Adrian Turner of Radio Times awarded it four stars out of five, stating "Cameron's script wouldn't have sustained Clark Gable and Vivien Leigh for 80 minutes, but, somehow, he and his magical cast revive that old-style studio gloss for three riveting hours. Titanic is a sumptuous assault on the emotions, with a final hour that fully captures the horror and the freezing, paralysing fear of the moment. And there are single shots, such as an awesome albatross-like swoop past the steaming ship, when you sense Cameron hugging himself with the fun of it all."

Titanic suffered backlash in addition to its success. Some reviewers felt that while the visuals were spectacular, the story and dialogue were weak. Richard Corliss of Time magazine wrote a mostly negative review, criticizing the lack of interesting emotional elements. Kenneth Turan's review in the Los Angeles Times was particularly scathing. Dismissing the emotive elements, he stated, "What really brings on the tears is Cameron's insistence that writing this kind of movie is within his abilities. Not only is it not, it is not even close", and later argued that the only reason that the film won Oscars was because of its box office total. Barbara Shulgasser of The San Francisco Examiner gave Titanic one star out of four, citing a friend as saying, "The number of times in this unbelievably badly written script that the two [lead characters] refer to each other by name was an indication of just how dramatically the script lacked anything more interesting for the actors to say."

Retrospective
According to Dalin Rowell of /Film, "With complaints about its lengthy runtime, observations that certain characters could have easily fit onto pieces of floating furniture, and jokes about its melodramatic nature, Titanic is no stranger to modern-day criticism." In 2002, filmmaker Robert Altman called it "the most dreadful piece of work I've ever seen in my entire life". Similarly, French New Wave director and former Cahiers du Cinéma editor Jacques Rivette referred to it as "garbage" in a 1998 interview with Frédéric Bonnaud and was particularly critical of Winslet's performance, who he said was "unwatchable, the most slovenly girl to appear on the screen in a long, long time." In 2003, the film topped a poll of "Best Film Endings", but it also topped a poll by Film 2003 as "the worst movie of all time". In his 2012 study of the lives of the passengers on the Titanic, historian Richard Davenport-Hines said, "Cameron's film diabolized rich Americans and educated English, anathematizing their emotional restraint, good tailoring, punctilious manners and grammatical training, while it made romantic heroes of the poor Irish and the unlettered". The British film magazine Empire reduced their rating of the film from the maximum five stars and an enthusiastic review, to four stars with a less positive review in a later edition, to accommodate its readers' tastes, who wanted to disassociate themselves from the hype surrounding the film, and the reported activities of its fans, such as those attending multiple screenings. In addition to this, positive and negative parodies and other such spoofs of the film abounded and were circulated on the internet, often inspiring passionate responses from fans of various opinions of the film. Benjamin Willcock of DVDActive.com did not understand the backlash or the passionate hatred for the film. "What really irks me...," he said, "are those who make nasty stabs at those who do love it." Willcock stated, "I obviously don't have anything against those who dislike Titanic, but those few who make you feel small and pathetic for doing so (and they do exist, trust me) are way beyond my understanding and sympathy."

In 1998, Cameron responded to the backlash, and Kenneth Turan's review in particular, by writing "Titanic is not a film that is sucking people in with flashy hype and spitting them out onto the street feeling let down and ripped off. They are returning again and again to repeat an experience that is taking a 3-hour and 14-minute chunk out of their lives, and dragging others with them, so they can share the emotion." Cameron emphasized that people from all ages (ranging from 8 to 80) and from all backgrounds were "celebrating their own essential humanity" by seeing it. He described the script as earnest and straightforward, and said it intentionally "incorporates universals of human experience and emotion that are timeless – and familiar because they reflect our basic emotional fabric" and that the film was able to succeed in this way by dealing with archetypes. He did not see it as pandering. "Turan mistakes archetype for cliché," he said. "I don't share his view that the best scripts are only the ones that explore the perimeter of human experience, or flashily pirouette their witty and cynical dialogue for our admiration."

In 2000, Almar Haflidason of the BBC wrote that "the critical knives were out long before James Cameron's Titanic was complete. Spiralling costs that led to it becoming the most expensive motion picture of the 20th Century, and a cast without any big stars seemed to doom the film before release. But box office and audience appreciation proved Cameron right and many critics wrong." He added that "the sinking of the great ship is no secret, yet for many exceeded expectations in sheer scale and tragedy" and that "when you consider that [the film] tops a bum-numbing three-hour running time, then you have a truly impressive feat of entertainment achieved by Cameron". Empire eventually reinstated its original five-star rating of the film, commenting: "It should be no surprise[,] then[,] that it became fashionable to bash James Cameron's Titanic at approximately the same time it became clear that this was the planet's favourite film. Ever."

In 2017, on the 20th anniversary of its release, the film was selected for preservation in the United States National Film Registry by the Library of Congress as being "culturally, historically, or aesthetically significant". It was listed among the 100 best films in an Empire poll and in a later poll of members of the film industry. In 2021, Dalin Rowell of /Film ranked it the third-best film of Cameron's career, stating that it is "easily one of his best films, simply because it defied the odds", and considering it "a legitimately remarkable achievement — one that, despite its large budget, has a humble, earnest center. Even with all of the jokes the Internet loves to throw its way, Titanic demonstrates that Cameron is truly capable of everything he can imagine."

Accolades

Titanic began its awards sweep starting with the Golden Globes, winning four: Best Motion Picture – Drama, Best Director, Best Original Score, and Best Original Song. Kate Winslet and Gloria Stuart were also nominees. The film garnered fourteen Academy Award nominations, tying the record set in 1950 by Joseph L. Mankiewicz's All About Eve and won eleven: Best Picture (the second film about the Titanic to win that award, after 1933's Cavalcade), Best Director, Best Art Direction, Best Cinematography, Best Visual Effects, Best Film Editing, Best Costume Design, Best Sound (Gary Rydstrom, Tom Johnson, Gary Summers, Mark Ulano), Best Sound Effects Editing, Best Original Dramatic Score, Best Original Song. Kate Winslet, Gloria Stuart and the make-up artists were the three nominees that did not win, ultimately losing to Helen Hunt in As Good as It Gets, Kim Basinger in L.A. Confidential and Men in Black simultaneously. James Cameron's original screenplay and Leonardo DiCaprio were not nominees. It was the second film to receive eleven Academy Awards, after Ben-Hur. The Lord of the Rings: The Return of the King would also match this record in 2004.

Titanic won the 1997 Academy Award for Best Original Song, as well as four Grammy Awards for Record of the Year, Song of the Year, Best Song Written Specifically for a Motion Picture or Television, and Best Female Pop Vocal Performance. The film's soundtrack became the best-selling primarily orchestral soundtrack of all time, and became a worldwide success, spending sixteen weeks at number-one in the United States, and was certified diamond for over eleven million copies sold in the United States alone. The soundtrack also became the best-selling album of 1998 in the U.S. "My Heart Will Go On" won the Grammy Awards for Best Song Written Specifically for a Motion Picture or for Television.

The film also won various awards outside the United States, including the Awards of the Japanese Academy as the Best Foreign Film of the Year. Titanic eventually won nearly ninety awards and had an additional forty-seven nominations from various award-giving bodies around the world. Additionally, the book about the making of the film was at the top of The New York Times bestseller list for several weeks, "the first time that such a tie-in book had achieved this status".

Since its release, Titanic has appeared on the American Film Institute's award-winning 100 Years... series. So far, it has ranked on the following six lists:

Home media
Titanic was released worldwide in widescreen and pan and scan formats on VHS on September 1, 1998. More than $50 million was spent to market the home video release of the film. Both VHS formats were also made available in a deluxe boxed gift set with a mounted filmstrip and six lithograph prints from the movie. In the first 3 months, the film sold 25 million copies in North America with a total sales value of $500 million becoming the best selling live-action video, beating Independence Day. In that time, it sold 58 million copies worldwide, outselling The Lion King for a total worldwide revenue of $995 million. By March 2005, the film has sold 8 million DVD and 59 million VHS units. In the United Kingdom, the film sold 1.1 million copies on its first day of release, making it the country's fastest-selling home video release. It would hold this record until it was surpassed by Harry Potter and the Sorcerer's Stone in May 2002 when that film sold 1.2 million home video units during its first day. Within the first week of release, Titanic quickly beat The Full Monty, selling a total of 1.8 million home video copies.

A DVD version was released on August 31, 1999, in a widescreen-only (non-anamorphic) single-disc edition with no special features other than a theatrical trailer. Cameron stated at the time that he intended to release a special edition with extra features later. This release became the best-selling DVD of 1999 and early 2000, becoming the first DVD ever to sell one million copies. At the time, less than 5% of all U.S. homes had a DVD player. "When we released the original Titanic DVD, the industry was much smaller, and bonus features were not the standard they are now," said Meagan Burrows, Paramount's president of domestic home entertainment, which made the film's DVD performance even more impressive.

Titanic was re-released to DVD on October 25, 2005, when a three-disc Special Collector's Edition was made available in the United States and Canada. This edition contained a newly restored transfer of the film, a 6.1 DTS-ES Discrete surround sound mix and various special features. In PAL regions, two-disc and four-disc variants were released, marketed as the Special Edition and Deluxe Collector's Edition respectively. They were released in the United Kingdom on November 7, 2005. A limited 5-disc set of the film, under the title Deluxe Limited Edition, was also only released in the United Kingdom with only 10,000 copies manufactured. The fifth disc contains Cameron's documentary Ghosts of the Abyss, which was distributed by Walt Disney Pictures. Unlike the individual release of Ghosts of the Abyss, which contained two discs, only the first disc was included in the set. In 2007, for the film's tenth anniversary, a 10th Anniversary Edition was released on DVD, which consists of the first two discs from the three-disc 2005 set containing the movie and the special features on those discs.

The film was released on Blu-ray and Blu-ray 3D on September 10, 2012. The 3D presentation of the film is split over two discs and is also THX-certified. Special features on another disc included many of those featured on the 2005 Special Collector's Edition DVD along with two new documentaries titled "Reflections on Titanic" and "Titanic: The Final Word with James Cameron." The latter aired on National Geographic on April 9, 2012 and was executively produced by Cameron.

Re-releases

3D conversion
A 2012 3D re-release was created by re-mastering the original to 4K resolution and post-converting to stereoscopic 3D format. The Titanic 3D version took 60 weeks and $18 million to produce, including the 4K restoration. The 3D conversion was performed by Stereo D. Digital 2D and in 2D IMAX versions were also struck from the new 4K master created in the process. The only scene entirely redone for the re-release was Rose's view of the night sky at sea on the morning of April 15, 1912. The scene was replaced with an accurate view of the night-sky star pattern, including the Milky Way, adjusted for the location in the North Atlantic Ocean in April 1912. The change was prompted by astrophysicist Neil deGrasse Tyson, who had criticized the scene for showing an unrealistic star pattern. He agreed to send film director Cameron a corrected view of the sky, which was the basis of the new scene.

The 3D version of Titanic premiered at the Royal Albert Hall in London on March 27, 2012, with James Cameron and Kate Winslet in attendance, and entered general release on April 4, 2012, six days shy of the centenary of RMS Titanic embarking on her maiden voyage.

Rolling Stone film critic Peter Travers rated the reissue  stars out of 4, explaining he found it "pretty damn dazzling". He said, "The 3D intensifies Titanic. You are there. Caught up like never before in an intimate epic that earns its place in the movie time capsule." Writing for Entertainment Weekly, Owen Gleiberman gave the film an A grade. He wrote, "For once, the visuals in a 3-D movie don't look darkened or distracting. They look sensationally crisp and alive." Richard Corliss of Time, who was very critical in 1997, remained in the same mood: "I had pretty much the same reaction: fitfully awed, mostly water-logged." In regards to the 3D effects, he noted the "careful conversion to 3D lends volume and impact to certain moments... [but] in separating the foreground and background of each scene, the converters have carved the visual field into discrete, not organic, levels." Ann Hornaday for The Washington Post found herself asking "whether the film's twin values of humanism and spectacle are enhanced by Cameron's 3-D conversion, and the answer to that is: They aren't." She further added that the "3-D conversion creates distance where there should be intimacy, not to mention odd moments in framing and composition."

The film grossed an estimated $4.7 million on the first day of its re-release in North America (including midnight preview showings) and went on to make $17.3 million over the weekend, finishing in third place. Outside North America it earned $35.2 million, finishing second, and it improved on its performance the following weekend by topping the box office with $98.9 million. China has proven to be its most successful territory, where it earned $11.6 million on its opening day, going on to earn a record-breaking $67 million in its opening week and taking more money in the process than it did in the entirety of its original theatrical run. The reissue ultimately earned $343.4 million worldwide, with $145 million coming from China and $57.8 million from Canada and the United States.

With a worldwide box office of nearly $350 million, the 3D re-release of Titanic remains the highest grossing re-released film of all time, ahead of The Lion King, Star Wars, and Avatar.

The 3D conversion of the film was also released in the 4DX format in selected international territories, which allows the audience to experience the film's environment using motion, wind, fog, lighting and scent-based special effects.

20th anniversary
For the 20th anniversary of the film, Titanic was re-released in cinemas in Dolby Vision (in both 2D and 3D) for one week beginning December 1, 2017.

25th anniversary
Titanic was re-released in theaters by Paramount domestically and Walt Disney Studios Motion Pictures (through the 20th Century Studios label) internationally on February 10, 2023, in a remastered 3D 4K HDR render, with high frame rate, as part of the film's 25th anniversary. For this version, the international prints update 20th Century's logo with the studio's current name, as a result of Disney's 2019 acquisition of the studio.

Titanic Live
Titanic Live was a live performance of James Horner's original score by a 130-piece orchestra, choir and Celtic musicians, accompanying a showing of the film. In April 2015, Titanic Live premiered at the Royal Albert Hall, London, where the 2012 3D re-release had premiered.

Merchandise
A board game based on the film, titled Titanic: The Game, was released in 2020 by Spin Master Games.

See also
 List of Academy Award records
 Titanic: Music from the Motion Picture

Notes

References

Further reading

External links

 
 
 
 
 Titanic at The Numbers
 Screenplay of Titanic at The Internet Movie Script Database
 Paramount Movies - Titanic
 

 
1990s adventure films
1990s American films
1990s disaster films
1990s English-language films
1997 films
1997 romantic drama films
20th Century Fox films
3D re-releases
American 3D films
American adventure drama films
American disaster films
American epic films
American historical romance films
American nonlinear narrative films
American romantic drama films
American survival films
Best Drama Picture Golden Globe winners
Best Picture Academy Award winners
Epic films based on actual events
Films about artists
Films about interclass romance
Films about mother–daughter relationships
Films about RMS Titanic
Films about social class
Films about survivors of seafaring accidents or incidents
Films directed by James Cameron
Films produced by James Cameron
Films produced by Jon Landau
Films scored by James Horner
Films set in 1912
Films set in 1996
Films set in the Atlantic Ocean
Films set in Newfoundland and Labrador
Films set on ships
Films shot in Mexico
Films shot in Nova Scotia
Films shot in Vancouver
Films that won the Best Costume Design Academy Award
Films that won the Best Original Score Academy Award
Films that won the Best Original Song Academy Award
Films that won the Best Sound Editing Academy Award
Films that won the Best Sound Mixing Academy Award
Films that won the Best Visual Effects Academy Award
Films using motion capture
Films whose art director won the Best Art Direction Academy Award
Films whose cinematographer won the Best Cinematography Academy Award
Films whose director won the Best Directing Academy Award
Films whose director won the Best Director Golden Globe
Films whose editor won the Best Film Editing Academy Award
Films with screenplays by James Cameron
Historical epic films
IMAX films
Lightstorm Entertainment films
Love stories
Murder–suicide in films
Paramount Pictures films
Romantic drama films based on actual events
Romantic epic films
Sea adventure films
Seafaring films based on actual events
United States National Film Registry films